James Blackwell may refer to:

 James Blackwell (basketball) (born 1968), American basketball player
 James Blackwell (rugby union) (born 1995), New Zealand rugby union player
 James Bartholomew Blackwell (1763–1820), Irish mercenary and French Army officer
 James DeRuyter Blackwell (1828–1901), author and poet of the American Civil War era
 James Eustace Blackwell (1865–1939), American architect, primarily in the Northwest